The 1964 United States Senate election in Wyoming took place on November 3, 1964. Incumbent Democratic Senator Gale W. McGee ran for re-election to his second term. In the general election, he faced Republican nominee John S. Wold, the former Chairman of the Republican Party of Wyoming and a former State Representative. Despite Wyoming's long conservative streak, McGee was aided by the strong performance by President Lyndon B. Johnson in Wyoming. McGee ended up winning re-election by a relatively narrow, but decisive, margin, beating Wold 54-46%.

Democratic primary

Candidates
 Gale W. McGee, incumbent U.S. Senator
 I. Wayne "Bud" Kinney, former Chairman of the Benjamin Franklin Party

Results

Republican Primary

Candidates
 John S. Wold, former Chairman of the Republican Party of Wyoming, former State Representative
 Kenny Sailors, basketball player, former State Representative, 1962 Republican candidate for the U.S. Senate

Results

General election

Results

References

United States Senate elections in Wyoming
Wyoming
United States Senate